State Route 295 (SR 295) is  state highway in Pickett County, Tennessee, connecting SR 111 in Byrdstown to US 127/SR 28 near Pall Mall. For the majority of its length, SR 295 is known as Parker Road.

Route description

SR 295 begins in Byrdstown at an intersection with SR 111 north of downtown. The highway then leaves Byrdstown and winds its way east through slightly rugged terrain to cross a bridge over the Wolf River before continuing east through farmland and passing through the Asbury community. SR 295 then comes to an end shortly thereafter at an intersection with US 127/SR 28 northwest of Pall Mall.

The entire route of SR 295 is a rural two-lane highway.

Major intersections

References

295
Transportation in Pickett County, Tennessee